William Field (April 12, 1790 – September 20, 1878) was an American politician who was the 46th lieutenant governor of Connecticut from 1855 to 1856.

Early life
Field was born on April 12, 1790 in Pomfret, Connecticut, to William Field and Lydia Colwell. He was descended from Roger Williams, the founder of Rhode Island on his maternal side.  In his early life Field worked at forging machinery. He served in the U.S. military during the War of 1812 in a New London, Connecticut, company.

He married Martha Pinney in 1820; they had five children and resided in Stafford, Connecticut. Her death in 1835 left him a widower.

Political career
In 1835, Field was nominated on the Jacksonian Democrat ticket to the office of Connecticut state comptroller. He was elected and served from 1836-1838.

He was elected a member of Connecticut state senate, representing the 14th District from 1849-50. In 1855, Field was elected Lieutenant Governor of Connecticut as a Free Soil Party candidate.

Field died on September 20, 1878 in Stafford, Connecticut.

References

1790 births
1878 deaths
Lieutenant Governors of Connecticut
American abolitionists
Connecticut Jacksonians
American military personnel of the War of 1812
Connecticut Comptrollers
People from Pomfret, Connecticut
Connecticut Free Soilers